Trek is a Russian rock band formed in Khabarovsk, Soviet Russia, in 1977.

History
The group was formed in 1977.

The constant structure was formed in 1980. In 1982 they published their first album «Flying for line».

In 1991 the band played at a Soviet-Japanese-American festival in Vladivostok.

In 1995 the group published the CD «Blessed to Feel», the first CD of a Far Eastern rock group. There was a considerable number of groups by then in Khabarovsk and the band "Track" decided to start rock club "Roxy" on June, 24th, 1995. Andrei (or Andrey) Alpatov (1967-2022) also joined as drummer in 1995.

In 1996 "Track" performed at the Russian-American festival in Vladivostok "Vladi-ROCKstok-96". There was a manager of the band "Nazareth" present at that festival. He invited the "Track" for a joint concert with «Nazareth» in Vladivostok. The «Nazareth» tour coincided with Dan McCafferty's 50th birthday and "Track" also was officially invited to celebrate his birthday. McCafferty said in exclusive interview for TVA: «"Trek" is the best that I heard in Russia». But then "Trek" broke up.

2006. In Moscow two former musicians of the group, guitarist and composer Yury Miroshnichenko (Peps) and vocalist Vladimir Kotov revived TREK.

2007. The band celebrated the 30th anniversary.

Nowadays the band plays as "Trek Division" or "Peps Division".

Band members
Yuri 'Peps' Miroshnichenko - guitar, back-vocal

Vladimir Kotov - vocal,

Fedor Vasilyev - bass-guitar, back-vocal

Igor Cherevko - drums

Discography
 1982 the first album Flying for line
 1995 the second album (and the first CD of the band) Blessed to feel

External links
 Trek and Nazareth in 1996
 Peps in Barricada club 22/07/2012
 Fan-site of the band
 Official (old) website
 Peps Division website
 

Russian rock music groups
1977 establishments in Russia
2011 disestablishments in Russia
Musical groups established in 1977
Musical groups disestablished in 2011
Soviet rock music groups